Allison Mills (born May 9, 1951), also known as Alley Bean, is an American actress best known for her role as Norma Arnold, the mother in the coming-of-age series The Wonder Years, and her role as Pamela Douglas, the sister of the late Forrester matriarch Stephanie Forrester (Susan Flannery), on the soap opera The Bold and the Beautiful.  She currently portrays Heather Webber on ABC's General Hospital.

Early life and education
Mills was born in Chicago, Illinois. Her father was television executive Ted Mills, and her mother, Joan (née Paterson) Mills Kerr, was an author and editor for American Heritage magazine. Her stepmother was actress Genevieve (Ginette Marguerite Auger), and her stepfather was Chester B. Kerr, a director of Yale University Press. She has one sister, Hilary Mills Loomis, and one brother, Tony Mills. She received a B.A. magna cum laude in drama and art history from Yale University in 1973 and an M.A. from London Academy of Music and Dramatic Art.

Career
Her first acting role on television was in the short-lived comedy The Associates, where she played an attorney, opposite Martin Short.

Mills appeared on a special "Celebrity TV Moms" episode of the Anne Robinson version of The Weakest Link, in which she was the second contestant eliminated.

Mills had a recurring role in the television series Dr. Quinn, Medicine Woman as Marjorie Quinn, Dr. Michaela Quinn's sister. She had previously appeared in the series as a saloon girl.

In December 2006, Mills joined the cast of The Bold and the Beautiful under contract as Pamela Douglas, the estranged sister of Stephanie Douglas Forrester. But in March 2007, after making only a handful of appearances, her character went insane, was confined to a mental hospital, and then disappeared from the show. Mills reprised the role on recurring status in 2007 and 2008, and by December 2008, was added to the opening credits as a contract player. In November 2019, it was reported that Mills was off contract with the show. Mills made a return appearance to The Bold and the Beautiful in August 2021.

In October, 2022, Mills replaced Robin Mattson as legacy character, Heather Webber on General Hospital

Personal life
Mills' husband was author, film, television and stage actor Orson Bean. Bean was well known as a long-term celebrity panelist of To Tell the Truth and Match Game. Mills (23 years his junior) was Bean's third wife, married from 1993 until his death in 2020.

Filmography

Film

Television

References

External links

1951 births
Living people
20th-century American actresses
21st-century American actresses
Actresses from Chicago
American child actresses
American film actresses
American soap opera actresses
American television actresses